Oribatellidae is a family of mites belonging to the order Sarcoptiformes.

Genera
Genera:
 Berniniella Özdikmen, 2008
 Cavernella Bernini, 1975
 Cuspidozetes Hammer, 1962
 Fberninia  Özdikmen, 2008
 Fenestrobates  Balogh & Mahunka, 1969
 Ferolocella  Grabowski, 1971
 Gendzella  Kuliev, 1977
 Joelia  Oudemans, 1906
 Kunstella  Krivolutsky, 1974
 Lamellobates  Hammer, 1958
 Novoribatella  Engelbrecht, 1986
 Ophidiotrichus  Grandjean, 1953
 Oribatella  Banks, 1895
 Palmitalia  Pérez-Íñigo & Peña, 1997
 Prionoribatella  Aoki, 1975
 Safrobates  Mahunka, 1989
 Sagittazetes Balogh, 1983
 Siciliotrichus  Bernini, 1973

References

Sarcoptiformes